Lusitania was an ancient Iberian Roman province located where modern Portugal (south of the Douro river) and 
a portion of western Spain (the present Extremadura and the province of Salamanca) lie. It was named after the Lusitani or Lusitanian people (an Indo-European people).

Its capital was Emerita Augusta (currently Mérida, Spain), and it was initially part of the Roman Republic province of Hispania Ulterior, before becoming a province of its own in the Roman Empire. Romans first came to the territory around the mid-2nd century BC. A war with Lusitanian tribes followed, from 155 to 139 BC. In 27 BC, the province was created.

Lusitania was and is often used as an alternative name for Portugal.

Origin of the name 
The etymology of the name of the Lusitani (who gave the Roman province its name) remains unclear. Popular etymology connected the name to a supposed Roman demigod Lusus, whereas some early-modern scholars suggested that Lus was a form of the Celtic Lugus followed by another (unattested) root *tan-, supposed to mean "tribe", while others derived the name from Lucis, an ancient people mentioned in Avienius' Ora Maritima (4th century AD) and from tan (-stan in Iranian), or from tain, meaning "a region" or implying "a country of waters", a root word that formerly meant a prince or sovereign governor of a region.

Ancient Romans, such as Pliny the Elder (Natural History, 3.5) and Varro (116 – 27 BC, cited by Pliny), speculated that the name Lusitania had Roman origins, as when Pliny says "lusum enim Liberi Patris aut lyssam cum eo bacchantium nomen dedisse Lusitaniae et Pana praefectum eius universae" [Lusitania takes its name from the Lusus associated with Bacchus and the Lyssa of his Bacchantes, and Pan is its governor].

Lusus is usually translated as "game" or "play", while lyssa is a borrowing from the Greek λυσσα, "frenzy" or "rage", and sometimes Rage personified; for later poets, Lusus and Lyssa become flesh-and-blood companions (even children) of Bacchus. Luís de Camões' epic Os Lusíadas (1572), which portrays Lusus as the founder of Lusitania, extends these ideas, which have no connection with modern etymology.

In his work, Geography, the classical geographer Strabo (died ca. 24 AD) suggests a change had occurred in the use of the name "Lusitanian". He mentions a group who had once been called "Lusitanians" living north of the Douro river but were called in his day "Callacans".

Lusitanians

The Lusitani, who were Indo-European speakers, established themselves in the region in the 6th century BC, but historians and archeologists are still undecided about their ethnogenesis. Some modern authors consider them to be an indigenous people who were Celticized culturally and possibly also through intermarriage.

The archeologist Scarlat Lambrino defended the position that the Lusitanians were a tribal group of Celtic origin related to the Lusones (a tribe that inhabited the east of Iberia). Some have claimed that both tribes came from the Swiss mountains. Others argue that the evidence points to the Lusitanians being a native Iberian tribe, resulting from intermarriage between different local tribes.  

The first area colonized by the Lusitani was probably the Douro valley and the region of Beira Alta (present day Portugal); in Beira, they stayed until they defeated the Celtici and other tribes, then they expanded to cover a territory that reached Estremadura before the arrival of the Romans.

War against Rome

The Lusitani are mentioned for the first time in Livy who describes them as fighting for the Carthaginians in 218 BCE; they are reported as fighting against Rome in 194 BC, sometimes allied with Celtiberian tribes.

In 179 BC, the praetor Lucius Postumius Albinus celebrated a triumph over the Lusitani, but in 155 BC, on the command of Punicus (Πουνίκου, perhaps a Carthaginian) first and Caesarus (Καίσαρος) after, the Lusitani reached Gibraltar. Here they were defeated by the praetor Lucius Mummius.

From 152 BC onwards, the Roman Republic had difficulties in recruiting soldiers for the wars in Hispania, deemed particularly brutal.  In 150 BC, Servius Sulpicius Galba organised a false armistice. While the Lusitani celebrated this new alliance, he massacred them, selling the survivors as slaves; this caused a new rebellion led by Viriathus, who was after many attempts killed by traitors paid by the Romans in 139 BC, after having led a successful guerrilla campaign against Rome and their local allies. Two years after, in 137 BC Decimus Junius Brutus Callaicus led a successful campaign against the Lusitani, reaching as far north as the Minho river.

Romans scored other victories with proconsul Decimus Junius Brutus Callaicus and Gaius Marius (elected in 113 BC), but still the Lusitani resisted with a long guerilla war; they later joined Sertorius' (a renegade Roman General) troops (around 80 BC) and Julius Caesar conducted a successful campaign against them in 61-60 BC, but they were not finally defeated until the reign of Augustus (around 28–24 BC).

Roman province

Division under Augustus (25–20 BC)
With Lusitania (and Asturia and Gallaecia), Rome had completed the conquest of the Iberian peninsula, which was then divided by Augustus (25–20 BC or 16-13 BC) into the eastern and northern Hispania Tarraconensis, the southwestern Hispania Baetica and the western Provincia Lusitana. Originally, Lusitania included the territories of Asturia and Gallaecia, but these were later ceded to the jurisdiction of the new Provincia Tarraconensis and the former remained as Provincia Lusitania et Vettones. Its northern border was along the Douro river, while on its eastern side its border passed through Salmantica (Salamanca) and Caesarobriga (Talavera de la Reina) to the Anas (Guadiana) river.

Between 28 and 24 BC Augustus' military campaigns pacified all Hispania under Roman rule, with the foundation of Roman cities like Asturica Augusta (Astorga) and Bracara Augusta (Braga) to the north, and to the south Emerita Augusta (Mérida) (settled with the emeriti of the Legio V Alaudae and Legio X Gemina legions).

Between the time of Augustus and Claudius, the province was divided into three conventus iuridicus, territorial units presided by capital cities with a court of justice and joint Roman/indigenous people assemblies (conventus), that counseled the Governor:

Conventus Emeritensis, with capital in Emerita Augusta (Mérida, Spain)
Conventus Scalabitanus, with capital in Scalabis Iulia (Santarém, Portugal)
Conventus Pacensis, with capital in Pax Iulia (Beja, Portugal)

The conventus ruled of a total of 46 populis, 5 being Roman colonies (Emerita Augusta (Mérida, Spain), Pax Iulia (Beja), Scalabis (Santarém), Norba Caesarina and Metellinum). Felicitas Iulia Olisipo (Lisbon, which was a Roman law municipality) and 3 other towns had the old Latin status (Ebora (Évora), Myrtilis Iulia (Mértola) and Salacia (Alcácer do Sal). The other 37 were of stipendiarii class, among which Aeminium (Coimbra), Balsa (Tavira), or Mirobriga (Santiago do Cacém). Other cities include Ossonoba (Faro), Cetobriga (Tróia, Setúbal), Collippo (Leiria) or Arabriga (Alenquer).

Division under Diocletian
Under Diocletian, Lusitania kept its borders and was ruled by a praeses, later by a consularis; finally, in 298 AD, it was united with the other provinces to form the Diocesis Hispaniarum ("Diocese of the Hispanias").

Governors
 Quintus Acutius Faienanus, legatus Augusti pro praetore between 19 and 1 BC.
 Quintus Articuleius Regulus, between 2 BC and AD 14.
 Gaius Ummidius Durmius Quadratus, c. 37
 Lucius Calventius Vetus Carminius, legatus Augusti pro praetore 44-45
 Marcus Salvius Otho Caesar Augustus Governor 58-68
 Gaius Catellius Celer 75/76-77/78
 ? Gaius Calpurnius Flaccus 119/120-120/121
 Gaius Oppius Sabinus Julius Nepos Manius Vibius Sollemnis Severus (under Hadrian)
 Lucius Roscius Maecius Celer Postumus Mamilianus Vergilius Staberianus (under Hadrian)
 Gaius Javolenus Calvinus (between 138 and 140)
 Aulus Avillius Urinatius Quadratus c.151-c.154
 ? Cornelius Repentinus c. 185 - c. 188
 Publius Septimius Geta c. 188 - c. 191
 Gaius Caesonius Macer Rufinianus 193/194 - 197
 Gaius Junius Faustinus [Pl]a[cidus] Postumianus c. 197 - c. 200
 Decimus Jun[ius? ...] Coelianus between 198 and 209
 Sextus Furnius Julianus c. 211
 Rutilius Pudens Crispinus around 225 - 227.
 Vettius Agorius Praetextatus (4th century)

Coloniae and Municipia
 Colonia Metellinum (Medellín, Badajoz)
 Colonia Norba Caesarina (Cáceres)
 Colonia Augusta Emerita (Mérida), provincial capital.
 Colonia Civitas Pacensis (Beja, Portugal)
 Colonia Scalabis Praesidium Iulium (Santarém, Portugal)
 Municipium Caesarobriga (Talavera de la Reina, Toledo)
 Municipium Augustobriga (Talavera la Vieja, Cáceres)
 Municipium Aeminium (Coimbra, Portugal)
 Municipium Conímbriga (Condeixa-a-Nova, Portugal)
 Municipium Salmantica (Salamanca)
 Municipium Caurium (Coria, Cáceres)
 Municipium Turgalium (Trujillo, Cáceres)
 Municipium Capara (Cáparra, Cáceres)
 Municipium Olisipo (Lisboa, Portugal)
 Municipium Egitandiorum (Idanha-a-Velha, Portugal)
 Municipium Regina Turdulorum (Casas de Reina, Badajoz)
 Municipium Lacobriga (Lagos, Portugal)

Notable Lusitanians 
Viriathus
Gaius Appuleius Diocles
Pope Damasus I

Legacy of the name

As with the Roman names of many European countries, Lusitania was and is often used as an alternative name for Portugal, especially in formal or literary and poetic contexts. The 16th-century colony that would eventually become Brazil was initially founded as "New Lusitania". In common use are such terms as Lusophone, meaning Portuguese-speaking, and Lusitanic, referring to the Community of Portuguese Language Countries—once Portugal's colonies and presently independent countries still sharing some common heritage. Prior to his invasion in 1807, Napoleon Bonaparte proposed the establishment of a French-backed puppet Kingdom of Northern Lusitania as one of the successor states to Portugal under the assumption that such a campaign would result in an easy French victory.

The province was also the namesake of the North Atlantic Ocean liner RMS Lusitania infamous for being torpedoed by a German U-boat in 1915. The ship's owners, the Cunard Line, commonly named their vessels after Roman provinces with the Lusitania so being called after the Roman Iberian province to the north of the Strait of Gibraltar while her sister ship RMS Mauretania was named after the Roman North African province on the south side of the strait.

See also

Lusitanian mythology
Lusitanian language
National Archaeology Museum (Portugal)
Ophiussa
History of Portugal
Timeline of Portuguese history
History of Spain
Timeline of Spanish history
Pre-Roman peoples of the Iberian Peninsula
Romanization of Hispania
Balsa (Roman town)

References

An etymological lexicon of Proto-Celtic

External links

Lusitania, Dictionary of Greek and Roman Geography
 Detailed map of the Pre-Roman Peoples of Iberia (around 200 BC)
Southern Star Article: Crewman's strange foreboding of disaster

 
.L
Roman provinces in Hispania
Provinces of the Roman Empire
History of Portugal by polity
Ancient Portugal
Medieval Portugal
States and territories established in the 1st century BC
States and territories disestablished in the 9th century
1st-century BC establishments in the Roman Republic
9th-century disestablishments in Portugal
1st millennium in Portugal